The Russian Jewish Congress is a non-profit charitable fund and Russian Jewish organization. It was established in 1996 by a group of Jewish businessmen, workers and religious figures with the goal of reviving Jewish life in Russia.

It unites some of the influential and prosperous Jews in Russia, high-standing state officers, businessmen and actors of science and culture. The RJC supports existing communities and fosters the creation of new communities. At the same time helps them to strengthen and to find their own sources of funding and stipulates terms for independently allocating funds for the local communities’ needs.

Leaders
Its administrating bodies are the Presidium, Council of Directors and Public Council. Heads of the Congress include Vladimir Resin, Mikhail Fridman, Yevgenia Albats, Vitaly Ginzburg, Yuliy Gusman, Andrey Kozyrev, Berel Lazar, Henri Reznik, Vladimir Solovyov, Gennady Khazanov, Matvey Ganapolsky, Mikhail Zhvanetsky, David Iakobachvili and others (data of the late 2004).

Checkup committee is headed by the deputy CEO of RAO UES Yakov Urinson.

Presidents
1996-2001: Vladimir Gusinsky
2001: Leonid Nevzlin
2001-2005: Yevgeny Satanovsky
2004-2005: Vladimir Slutsker
2005-2009: Viacheslav Kantor
2009–present: Yuri Kanner

Israel National Memorial to the Red Army 
In 2011, the Russian Jewish Congress supported the construction of the Israel National Memorial to the Red Army in the city of Netanya a.k.a. Victory Monument in Netanya. The organization donated $500,000 towards the construction of the monument, which opened on June 25, 2012.

See also
Federation of Jewish Communities of the CIS.

References

External links
RJC website  
RJC website  

Rabbinical organizations
Jewish organizations based in Russia
Jewish organizations established in 1996
Vladimir Gusinsky